Rafael González may refer to:

Rafael González (fencer) (born 1920), Argentine fencer
Rafael González (Chilean footballer) (born 1950), Chilean football midfielder
Rafael González (judoka) (born 1958), Mexican Olympic judoka
Rafael González (wrestler) (born 1956), Puerto Rican Olympic wrestler
Rafa (footballer, born 1970) (Rafael González Robles), Spanish footballer